Lakshya is a 2004 Indian Hindi-language coming-of-age  war-drama film directed by Farhan Akhtar and produced by Ritesh Sidhwani. It stars Amitabh Bachchan, Hrithik Roshan and Preity Zinta in lead roles with Boman Irani and Anjula Bedi in supporting roles. Based on the 1999 Kargil War, the film is about Karan Sheirgill, an aimless and lazy boy from Delhi who joins the Indian Army and transforms himself into a soldier to make his girlfriend Romila Dutta proud of him.

At the 50th Filmfare Awards, Lakshya received 4 nominations, including Best Director (Farhan) and Best Actor (Roshan), and won 2 awards – Best Choreography (Prabhu Deva for "Main Aisa Kyun Hoon...") and Best Cinematography.

Plot 

Karan Sheirgill is an aimless and lazy boy living in Delhi who has no goals for his future. His father Sanjeev Sheirgill is a wealthy businessman and his mother Shalini Sheirgill is a housewife. His girlfriend Romila Dutta aka Romi, an aspiring journalist, tries to make him understand that he needs to have a goal in life. Karan also wonders why he does not know what he wishes to pursue in life. Eventually, he aimlessly thinks of joining the Indian Army after his one of his friends decides to do so but backs out. However, his father ends up lashing out at him on learning about his decision. Infuriated, he decides to join the Indian Army and gains Romi's advice of not listening to anyone if he really desires to do so. Karan gives the Combined Defence Services Examination and gets selected into the Indian Military Academy in Dehradun. However, he is undisciplined and unused to life over there. He keeps receiving punishments during the military training from the team due to his overconfidence and laziness. Upset, he flees from the academy and is forced to confront his parents' low opinion of him. His decision also causes Romi to angrily break up with him for not respecting his own decision. Devastated, Karan finally comes to terms with his situation and makes his decision. He returns to the Indian Military Academy, takes his punishment, and becomes a focused, disciplined officer cadet.

1 year later, he commissions into the Indian Army as a lieutenant and is congratulated by his mother. Karan is posted to the 3rd battalion of the Punjab Regiment, commanded by Colonel Sunil Damle. The battalion is stationed in Kargil, Ladakh. Karan returns to Delhi on leave and is heartbroken to learn that Romi is getting engaged to her colleague Rajeev Goel. He meets his parents as well but his leave is cut short and he is recalled to his battalion due to an outbreak of hostilities in Kargil. He reports back to his battalion, where he is promoted to the rank of acting Captain. Colonel Damle briefs the officers on the latest situation and reveals that a number of infiltrators have crossed the Line of Control (LoC) from Pakistan and currently occupy a series of mountain peaks on the Indian side of the border. The battalion has been assigned to secure Point 5179, a crucial vantage point dominating the army's main supply line, the National Highway 1D. The northern side of the mountain is on the Pakistani side of the LoC, the western side has a 1000-foot vertical rock cliff and the southern side has 3 km of empty ground with no cover. Therefore, the battalion decides to attack from the eastern side of the mountain. The first part of the assault is successful. The battalion destroys the enemy's screening units with Karan cited for his bravery in saving another officer's life. Meanwhile, Romi gets stationed to Kargil as a war correspondent. Romi goes to Kargil where she meets a changed Karan and begins to fall in love with him again amidst the war. However, Karan remains reluctant to return her feelings as he is still under the impression that she's engaged. In the second phase of the assault, the battalion attacks the peak of the mountain but fails to capture it due to the strategic advantage and heavy weaponry the Pakistanis have. The unit suffers heavy casualties. Brigadier Puri summons Colonel Damle and gives him 48 hours to capture the peak – after that time period, responsibility for Point 5179 will be given to another battalion. Colonel Damle then orders a group of 12 officers and soldiers (including Karan) to scale the 1000-foot rock cliff on the western side of the mountain and flank the enemy stronghold. They will be provided with artillery support from the eastern side. Karan realises that he has finally found his goal in the form of capturing the peak. Karan also learns of Romi's failed engagement and expresses his feelings for her. Romi promises Karan she will wait for him whether he returns or not. The unit sets off on their mission and while moving through a grass field toward the rock cliff, they come under fire. The unit discovers a Pakistani mortar unit in the field and destroys it, but loses their commanding officer and a number of other soldiers. The team's radios are also destroyed, so they cannot communicate with battalion HQ. Out of the initial 12, only 6 remain. They decide to continue with the mission. They successfully scale the cliff and attack the Pakistani position during the night. Their assault is successful although Karan is wounded, and the team loses 3 more men. The next morning, Karan limps to the peak, where he plants the Indian flag and fires a flare, signalling to Colonel Damle and Subedar Major Pritam Singh that they captured the peak. Days later, Karan is shown leaving a military hospital and reuniting with his parents and Romi who asks him that what is his next aim after attaining his first one. Karan replies "you" and they both embrace.

The film ends with Colonel Damle paying respect to all the martyrs of Operation Vijay.

Cast

Production
Production of the film began in Mumbai, Maharashtra and it was shot at several different locations in the Indian state of Uttarakhand. The scenes in Kargil were shot in Ladakh. Some parts of the film centered around Hrithik Roshan's military training were also shot at the Indian Military Academy, Dehradun. Actual Indian Army officers also participated in the shooting of the film. Seeing both the actors and officers in the same getup, at times Preity Zinta would get confused separating the actual officers from the actors. Pankaj Tripathi, then a struggling actor, shot for the film at Ladakh with Roshan and this news went viral in Tripathi's village that he is shooting a film with a big actor like Roshan. But Tripathi's role was all cut during the editing and he was very disappointed to see that his role was cut from the film.

Soundtrack 

The film's soundtrack was composed by Shankar–Ehsaan–Loy, with lyrics by Javed Akhtar. Shaan's "Main Aisa Kyun Hoon", picturized on Hrithik, is a laid-back, funky-hip hop track. "Agar Main Kahoon" is the love duet, picturized on Hrithik-Preity. The trio used harmonica for the track. The title track "Lakshya" is a techno-flavored patriotic song by Shankar Mahadevan, which is followed by "Kandhon Se Milte", another patriotic song with the vocals of Kunal Ganjawala and Vijay Prakash. "Kitni Baatein", a pathos song, is crooned by Hariharan and Sadhana Sargam. There are two instrumentals, "Victory" and "Separation". The trumpet portion from "Victory" has been used as the background music for their logo by Excel.

Track list

The soundtrack received mixed-to-positive reviews from critics. Joginder Tuteja of Bollywood Hungama in his review, said "Lakshya does have good music that is very urban and will appeal to the class audience. Going by the theme of the movie, the album is pretty balanced and has been composed with style that speaks of class." Planet Bollywood found the album to be "as good as Dil Chahta Hai". Subhash K. Jha described the album as "daringly unusual sound with a show-offy kind of innovativeness". Sukanya Verma of Rediff.com, however, remarked that, though the album was good, it was below expectations and "lacked punch". According to the Indian trade website Box Office India, with around 11,00,000 units sold, this film's soundtrack album was the year's thirteenth highest-selling.

Box office
Lakshya netted around Rs. 23 crore at the domestic box office. Lakshya grossed $5,859,242 worldwide including $753,600 from North American markets and $5,105,642 from other markets. In the U.S., it performed better, grossing $380,000 on 59 screens [approx. Rs. 1.75 crore] in its opening weekend with the per screen average being around $6,440.

Critical reception
Lakshya was director Farhan Akhtar's second film, following the success of his first film, the cult classic Dil Chahta Hai (2001). However, despite the huge hype, it didn't fare as well at the box-office. However, with repeated telecasts over the television, over the years, Lakshya has been regarded as a cult film among an audience that argues it is Hrithik Roshan's best performance to date.

Awards 
52nd National Film Awards:
Best Choreography – Prabhu Deva for "Main Aisa Kyun Hoon..."

50th Filmfare Awards:
Won
Best Choreography – Prabhu Deva for "Main Aisa Kyun Hoon..."
Best Cinematographer – Christopher Popp
Nominated
 Best Director – Farhan Akhtar
 Best Actor – Hrithik Roshan

References

External links 

2004 films
Kargil War
Films set in the 1990s
2000s Hindi-language films
Indian coming-of-age films
Indian war drama films
Films based on Indo-Pakistani wars and conflicts
Films set in Jammu and Kashmir
Films shot in Ladakh
Films set in Uttarakhand
UTV Motion Pictures films
Indian Army in films
Films featuring a Best Choreography National Film Award-winning choreography
Kashmir conflict in films
Military of Pakistan in films
Films set in Kargil
Films directed by Farhan Akhtar